Allium lemmonii is a species of wild onion known by the common name Lemmon's onion, named for botanist John Gill Lemmon (1831–1908). It is native to the western United States, at elevations of 1200–1900 m in the Great Basin of Utah, Nevada, northern and eastern California, eastern Oregon, southwestern Idaho.

Lemmon's onion grows from a bulb one and a half to two centimeters wide and has a short, flattened stem up to 20 cm tall, which is thin along the edges. Atop the stem is an inflorescence of 10 to 40 bell-shaped flowers, which may be white to pink. The stamens may be purple or yellow; pollen is yellow. The ovary has a distinctive ridged mound shape in which all of the ovary parts appear melded together. This is a common plant in its native range. It favors dry clay soils.

References

lemmonii
Flora of California
Flora of Oregon
Flora of Idaho
Flora of Nevada
Flora of Utah
Endemic flora of the United States
Onions
Plants described in 1879
Taxa named by Sereno Watson
Flora without expected TNC conservation status